The Padang Tengku railway station is a Malaysian train station stationed at and named after the town of Padang Tengku, Lipis District, Pahang.

Train services
 Shuttle Timur 50/53/58/59 Gua Musang–Kuala Lipis

KTM East Coast Line stations
Lipis District
Railway stations in Pahang